Events from the year 1980 in France.

Incumbents
 President: Valéry Giscard d'Estaing 
 Prime Minister: Raymond Barre

Events
January – End of Renault 16 production after 15 years. The R16 was the first official production hatchback car in the world when it was launched in 1965.
February – Launch of the Renault Fuego sporting coupe, which replaces the Renault 15 and Renault 17 ranges.

Births

January to March
1 January – Jennifer Lauret, actress.
2 January – Jérôme Pineau, cyclist.
9 January – Arnaud Méla, rugby union player.
14 January – Guillaume Norbert, soccer player.
17 January – Jean-Daniel Padovani, soccer player.
23 January – Éric Berthou, cyclist.
27 January – Pascal Pédemonte, soccer player.
2 February – Florent Balmont, soccer player.
6 February – Ludovic Delporte, soccer player.
10 February – Sylvain Marchal, soccer player.
14 February – Frédéric Belaubre, athlete.
20 February – Imanol Harinordoquy, rugby union player.
20 February – Damien Renard, orienteering competitor.
23 February – Mathieu Berson, soccer player.
1 March – Djimi Traoré, soccer player.
7 March – Guillaume Moullec, soccer player.
13 March – Érik Boisse, épée fencer.
14 March – Virginie Pouchain, singer.
15 March – Christelle Lefranc, fashion model.
18 March – Sébastien Frey, soccer player.
21 March – Renaud Connen, soccer player.
25 March – Olivier Patience, tennis player.
27 March – Nicolas Duvauchelle, actor.
28 March – Olivier Thomert, soccer player.
30 March – Amélie Perrin, hammer thrower.

April to June
9 April – Isabelle Severino, gymnast.
15 April – Pierre-Alain Frau, soccer player.
22 April – Nicolas Douchez, soccer player.
30 April – Oumar Bakari, soccer player.
11 May – Aurore Trayan, archer.
13 May – Alexis Bertin, soccer player.
21 May – Benoît Peschier, whitewater kayaker.
25 May – Nicolas Mas, rugby union player.
2 June – Sylvain Cros, swimmer.
12 June – Benoît Caranobe, gymnast and Olympic medallist.
19 June – Jean Val Jean, pornographic actor.
22 June – Grégory Gabella, high jumper.
23 June – Damien Tixier, soccer player.
26 June – Rémy Vercoutre, soccer player.
27 June – François-Xavier Ménage, journalist

July to September
5 July – Eva Green, actress.
13 July – Cédric Hengbart, soccer player.
14 July – Mody Traoré, soccer player.
14 July – Jérôme Haehnel, tennis player.
22 July – Marc Giraudon, soccer player.
22 July – Jérémy Moreau, soccer player.
25 July – Diam's, rap artist.
1 August – Sylvain Armand, soccer player.
1 August – Romain Barras, decathlete.
2 August – Guillaume Lacour, soccer player.
7 August – Aurélie Claudel, model.
10 August – Frédéric Thomas, soccer player.
16 August – Julien Absalon, mountain biker.
20 August – Samuel Dumoulin, cyclist.
22 August – Grégory Leca, soccer player.
25 August – Ève Angeli, singer.
28 August – Fousseni Diawara, soccer player.
11 September – Christophe Le Mével, cyclist.
11 September – Julien Sablé, soccer player.
18 September – Ludovic Assemoassa, soccer player.
19 September – Maxime Méderel, cyclist.
26 September – Aurélien Rougerie, rugby union player.
28 September – Benjamin Nicaise, soccer player.

October to December
4 October – Ludivine Furnon, gymnast.
6 October – Arnaud Coyot, cyclist.
6 October – Abdoulaye Méïté, soccer player.
7 October – Matthieu Chalmé, soccer player.
7 October – Jean Marc Gaillard, cross-country skier.
7 October – Pantxi Sirieix, soccer player.
14 October – Bertrand Bossu, soccer player.
14 October – Audrey Marnay, supermodel.
19 October – Vincent Planté, soccer player.
25 October – Laurie Cholewa, television host.
10 November – Gregory Arnolin, soccer player.
12 November – Benoît Pedretti, soccer player.
13 November – Benjamin Darbelet, judoka.
13 November – Hubert Dupont, soccer player.
15 November – Kevin Staut, equestrian champion
22 November – Sabrina Lefrançois, figure skater.
25 November – Romain Poyet, soccer player.
26 November – Lionel Faure, rugby union player.
12 December – François Dubourdeau, soccer player.
12 December – Julien Martinelli, soccer player.
15 December – Élodie Gossuin, former beauty pageant winner, municipal politician.
16 December – Alban Lenoir, actor
19 December – Fabian Bourzat, ice dancer.
23 December – Jean-François Coux, soccer player.

Full date unknown
Alexis Lemaire, computer scientist and mental calculation champion.

Deaths

January to March
7 January – Simonne Mathieu, tennis player (b. 1908).
21 January – Georges Painvin, cryptanalyst (b. 1886).
14 February – Marie Besnard, accused serial poisoner (b. 1896).
4 March – Alfred Plé, rower and Olympic medallist (b. 1888).
14 March – Julien Moineau, cyclist (b. 1903).
21 March – Marcel Boussac, entrepreneur and horse breeder (b. 1889).
24 March – Pierre Etchebaster, real tennis player (b. 1893).
25 March – Roland Barthes, literary critic and philosopher (b. 1915).

April to June
6 April – Olivier Chevallier, motor cycle racer (b. 1949).
12 April – Georges Piot, rower and Olympic medallist (b. 1896).
15 April – Jean-Paul Sartre, philosopher, dramatist, novelist and critic (b. 1905).
2 May – Théophile Alajouanine, neurologist (b. 1890).
16 June – Benoît Fauré, cyclist (b. 1900).
17 June – Robert Jacquinot, cyclist (b. 1893).
18 June – André Leducq, cyclist, twice Tour de France winner (b. 1904).

July to September
18 July – Andrée Vaurabourg, pianist and teacher (b. 1894).
22 July – Pierre Coquelin de Lisle, sport shooter and Olympic gold medallist (b. 1900).
1 August – Patrick Depailler, motor racing driver (b. 1944).
27 August – André Marchal, organist and organ teacher (b. 1894).
29 August – Louis Darquier de Pellepoix, Commissioner for Jewish Affairs under the Vichy Régime (b. 1897).
2 September – Claude Ménard, athlete and Olympic medallist (b. 1906).
8 September – Maurice Genevoix, author (b. 1890).

October to December
6 October – Jean Robic, road racing cyclist, won 1947 Tour de France (b. 1921).
8 October – Maurice Martenot, cellist and inventor (b. 1898).
14 October – Louis Guilloux, writer (b. 1899).
6 November – Pierre Villon, member of the French Communist Party and of the French Resistance (b. 1901).
14 November – Pierre Magne, cyclist (b. 1906).
30 November – Bertrand Gille, historian of technology (b. 1920).
2 December – Romain Gary, novelist, film director, World War II aviator and diplomat (b. 1914).
28 December – Marcel Langiller, international soccer player (b. 1908).

Full date unknown
Paul Petard, botanist (b. 1912).

References

Links

1980s in France